Sex & Food (stylized as sex + food) is the fourth studio album by New Zealand band Unknown Mortal Orchestra, released on 6 April 2018 through Jagjaguwar. According to leader of UMO Ruban Nielson, the album features a more expansive and eclectic sound than previous records, inspired by the international locations where it was recorded, including Mexico City, Seoul, Hanoi and Reykjavík, as well as Nielson's native Auckland and home Portland.

The lead single of the album, "American Guilt", was released on 23 January 2018, while the music video premiered on 8 February 2018. "Not In Love We're Just High" was released on 27 February as the second single, and "Everyone Acts Crazy Nowadays" was released on 26 March as the third single.

An animated music video was made for the track "Hunnybee".

Critical reception

Sex & Food received generally positive reviews from critics. At Metacritic, which assigns a normalised rating out of 100 to reviews from mainstream publications, the album received an average score of 75 based on 19 reviews.

Track listing
All tracks written and produced by Ruban Nielson, except where noted.

Notes
  signifies a co-producer.

Personnel
Credits adapted from the liner notes of Sex & Food.
 Ruban Nielson – production, mixing; vocals , guitars , bass , Rhodes , synthesizer , percussion , MPC , electric sitar , piano , drones , drums , strings , HC-TT 
 Kody Nielson – drums , synthesizer , piano , percussion ; co-production , additional engineering 
 Jacob Portrait – bass , synthesizer ; co-production , additional engineering 
 Naomi Win – violin 
 Quincy McCrary – organ 
 Chris Nielson – saxophone 
 Bob Ludwig – mastering
 Neil Krug – cover
 Miles Johnson – layout

Charts

References

2018 albums
Jagjaguwar albums
Unknown Mortal Orchestra albums